MHD  is the eponymous debut studio album by French rapper MHD, released on April 15, 2016 by Artside, AZ, Capitol and Universal. The 15-track album contains collaborations with Fally Ipupa and Angélique Kidjo.

Track listing
"La Moula" – 3:27
"Afro Trap Part. 2 (Kakala Bomaye)" – 2:04
"Afro Trap, Part. 3 (Champions League)" – 2:17
"Afro Trap, Part. 4 (Fais le mouv)" – 2:35
"Mort ce soir" – 3:22
"A Kele N'ta" – 3:25
"Afro Trap Part. 5 (Ngatie Abedi)" –2:34
"Interlude Trap" – 2:13
"Amina" – 3:25
"Tout seul" – 3:07
"Afro Trap Part. 6 (Molo Molo)" – 2:20
"Ma vie" (featuring Fally Ipupa) – 3:07
"Roger Milla" – 3:20
"Maman j'ai mal" – 3:23
"Wanyinyin" (featuring Angélique Kidjo) – 3:26

Charts

Weekly charts

Year-end charts

References

2016 debut albums
French-language albums